Futbol Club Barcelona Rugby is a Spanish rugby union club. The senior team currently plays in División de Honor, the premier level of Spanish rugby union. Formed in 1924, the club is a member of the FC Barcelona family. The club currently plays its home games in La Teixonera.

Before the Spanish Civil War,  the club won the Spain Championship on three occasions and the Catalonia Championship seven times. During the 1940s and 1950s Barcelona was one of the strongest rugby clubs in Spain, winning a further 10 Spanish championships. In 1953 and 1954 they won the first Spanish league titles.

History

Formation 
On September 21, 1924  Barça played its first match, a friendly against CADCI in San Baudilio de Llobregat. This inaugural match was attended by the then president and founder of the club, Joan Gamper, who was accompanied by numerous executives. Barcelona won the match 9-5.

Francisco Baltasar Albèniz was made delegate of the rugby club by Gamper, who was a great admirer of the rugby and who saw Baltasar as a true FC Barcelona man, and a real pioneer of this sport in Spain. For the club's silver anniversary, two international matches were staged: the first against Stade Toulousain, reigning champions in France that year, and the second an exhibition against players from both Stade Toulousain and MSP Perpignan. Both matches were played in Les Corts, and despite the lack of grass pitches, the French players gave a great demonstration of their skills.

Early years 
In the 1925–26 season, Barcelona rose in the ranks of Spanish rugby and, under Corominas their coach, put together a formidable XV: Blasco, Aximeno, Folch, Fuste, Carreras, Aguilar, Bori, Estapé, Fontanella, Pujalte, Rufus, Isar, Ruiz, Rues, Rossini, Baides and Miquel. They won the club's first championships in Catalonia and Spain, and went on to win Catalan championship five seasons in a row.

1925 also saw two matches with international opponents: the first a 9-8 victory against Witte Devils of Perpignan, then champions of the Rousillón seconds, the club's first success against a French side. The second was against Stade Toulousain, who again had won the French championship and who comfortably beat Barcelona.

Continued success 
The 1926-27 season was extremely successful, with the both Barcelona's first and second team winning the Catalonia Championships. The Spanish Championship wasn't held that year. A British soldiers' team visited the club, and was defeated 20-0.

Two more Catalonia Championships were won in 1927-28 and 1928-29. 1928 also saw Barcelona's first trip abroad, as they travelled to play Lyon.

During the 1929-30 season, the quality of the Catalonia Championship was said to increase notably, but Barcelona won once again, and also won the Spanish Championship, defeating Real Madrid 39-3.

More success followed in 1931-32, as both Barcelona's teams won the Catalonia Championship, and also the Catalonia Cup, which was held for the first time. Barcelona won the Spanish Championship for a third time, beating Madrid away 20-3. That year they played a friendly in Valencia, their first ever match against the F.U.E., held in a packed and enthusiastic Estadio de Vallejo. Barcelona won 25-5.

The club experienced problems in 1933-34, when the strain of not being able to train properly and not having a home ground for two years took its toll. The Catalonia Championship was won by UE Santboiana.

1934-35 was more positive, as the club's management rented a pitch in Avenida Diagonal, meaning regular training was possible, and a higher level of playing standards was achieved. The second XV won the Catalonia Championship, while the first XV won the second-ever Catalonia Cup.

Reorganisation 
After the Civil War, F.C. Barcelona underwent reorganisation, and it was not until 1940 that friendly matches were played, in various stadia in Montjuïc, Diagonal and San Baudilio. The club board, presided over by the Marques of the Mesa de Asta, Enrique Piñeyro, gave the rugby club great support, leading to the creation of the Catalan Federation of Rugby at the start of 1941. An exhibition match against R.C.D Espanyol was played to a full house in Manresa, and Barcelona won 3-0.

1941-42 was a golden season, heralding the club's eighth Catalonia Championship and its fourth Spain Championship. Barcelona defeated Real Madrid 28-0 in the final, before beating SEU Madrid 17-8 in the final. Barcelona's captain Sardá received the cup from General José Moscardó Ituarte, head of the National Sports Delegation at the time. Barcelona's president Piñeyro travelled with the side to Madrid to offer the team moral support.

In 1945-46, the first and second teams once again won the Catalonia Championship. The first team won the Spain Championship, now known as the Generalísimo Cup, defeating Frente de Juventudes de Madrid 9-3 in the semi final, and, in Les Corts, winning the final 23-13 against SEU Madrid.

Over the next two decades, Barcelona enjoyed regular success, and by 1969 had won 19 Catalonia Championship and 14 Spain Championships, along with the Pyrenees Cup and the Iberian Cup. They won the first two División de Honor titles in 1953 and 1954, but did not participate in the tournament for fifteen seasons thereafter. In 1966, they won the Generalísimo Cupm the successor to the Spain Championship, when they beat neighbours Universitario 3-0 in the final, led by the international player Rocabert, and club legend Ramón Rabassa as their coach.

By 1972-73, the club was directed by Dalmacio Moner with Francisco Gallardo as his assistant, someone who had been connected with the club his whole life. These two men, along with Francisco Baltasar, were the men who would lead the club through both triumphs and troubles.

One of the major problems the club has had to face regularly is a lack of a permanent playing ground. Enrique Llaudet, club president in 1966, announced a new ground was in the pipeline, but the construction of the Palau de Gel and the Palau Blaugrana obligated the rugby team to move. Once the team was able to move back to its home ground, the finished at the top end of the table in 1972-73.

Recent years 
Since the mid-1970s, Barcelona have been promoted and relegated several times, moving between the top three tiers of rugby in Spain. In 1985, they won the Copa del Rey de Rugby, the latest successor of the Spain Championship, but spent much of the 1990s and early 2000s languishing in the lower tiers.

They were promoted to the top tier in 2006, after signing an agreement to replace the downsizing USAP Barcelona, but were relegated in the 2007-08 season. According to the terms of their agreement with USAP Barcelona, this meant they were actually demoted to the third tier, the same division in which their second team were playing. This in turn meant the seconds were relegated to regional levels, and their third team was disbanded. However, both the first and second team were promoted in 2009-10, and the first team, after playing in the second tier División de Honor B for five seasons, were promoted to the top tier División de Honor in 2014.

In 2018, Barcelona won the first-ever Catalan Supercup, beating Santboiana 21-17. In 2019, they reached the final of the Copa del Rey de Rugby, losing 23-24 in agonising fashion to Alcobendas, who scored a converted try in the 90th minute of play. In the same season, they finished 6th in the División de Honor, qualifying for the playoffs for the first time.

Current squad

Past performances 

19 seasons in División de Honor

Club honours 
División de Honor: 2
1952–53, 1953–54
Spain Championships/Copa del Rey: 16
1926, 1930, 1932, 1942, 1944, 1945, 1946, 1950, 1951, 1952, 1953, 1955, 1956, 1965, 1983, 1985
Copa Ibérica: 1
1971
Supercopa de España: 1
1983

Notable players 
 Huw Maldwyn Williams - Ex Bath academy player
 Teddy Barron - USA U20 international
 Sergio Guerrero - 6 caps for Spain
 Víctor Marlet - 8 caps for Spain
 Andrei Kovalenco - 37 caps for Spain (including the 1999 Rugby World Cup)
 Joan Losada - Player of the Spanish national rugby sevens team at the 2016 Summer Olympics
 Pol Pla - Player of the Spanish national rugby sevens team at the 2016 Summer Olympics

See also 
 Rugby union in Spain

References

External links 
 
 Squad 

Rugby
Rugby union teams in Catalonia
1924 establishments in Spain
Rugby clubs established in 1924